Robert Vivier (1894–1989) was a French-speaking Belgian poet and writer. 

He published his first collection, Le Menetrier, in 1924. He then gave: Dechirures (1927), Au bord du temps (1937), Le Miracle enferme (1939), Trace par l'oubli (1951), Chronos reve (1959). His anxious listening to everyday life, his nostalgia for the childhood of the world, his meditations on the "glory of life" and the "very sweet eternity that breathes the world" are expressed in free verses or very classical verses (sometimes sonnets). ), whose cuts he redistributes according to very personal musical laws. He was a professor at the University of Liege.
He has been member of the Royal Academy of French Language and Literature of Belgium from 1950 to 1989.
Among many other book, he wrote a biography of Louis Antoine, the founder of Antoinism.

1894 births
1989 deaths
Walloon movement activists
Belgian writers in French
Jean Rousselot. Dictionnaire de la poesie francaise contemporaine 1968, Auge, Guillon, Hollier -Larousse, Mooreau et Cie.-Librairie Larousse, Paris